St. Joseph's Catholic Church is a historic Roman Catholic church in Topeka, Kansas, United States. It was established to serve the needs of the growing population of Volga Germans, ethnic Germans from Russia.

The church was listed on the National Register of Historic Placesin 1971.  It was deemed "an outstanding Kansas
example of a large 19th century brick church building."

It is a red brick church.  Its NRHP nomination states: "Most impressive to one approaching the church are the two identical steeples towering over all the neighboring buildings and trees. These towers begin as squares and then are quite nicely transformed into octagons. This transformation is executed
very gracefully by first cutting off the square corners at the clock level; the next logical step is an octagon roof with equal sides."

References

External links

Sacred Heart – St. Joseph Catholic Parish

Churches in Topeka, Kansas
German-Russian culture in Kansas
Churches on the National Register of Historic Places in Kansas
Churches in the Roman Catholic Archdiocese of Kansas City in Kansas
Volga German diaspora
National Register of Historic Places in Topeka, Kansas